Donald Howard Shively (May 11, 1921 – August 13, 2005) was an American academic, historian, Japanologist, author and  professor emeritus of East Asian Languages and Cultures at the University of California, Berkeley. He was a leader of Japan studies in the United States.

Early life
Shively was the son of American missionaries in Japan.  He was born in Kyoto and educated at the Canadian Academy in Japan.

Years of study in the United States began when he entered Harvard in 1940, but his college years were interrupted by war. In World War II, Shively was a Japanese language officer. He was promoted to the rank of major in the United States Marine Corps, and his service was marked by the Bronze Star Medal. His training during WWII at Camp Ritchie's Military Intelligence Training Center classifies him as one of the Ritchie Boys.

Shively received his bachelor's degree from Harvard University in 1946 (Class of '44). He continued his studies in Cambridge, and he earned a master's degree in 1947. He was awarded a Ph.D. in 1951.

Career
Shively began his teaching career at the University of California, Berkeley. He was at Berkeley from 1950 to 1962. During this period, he edited the Journal of Asian Studies (1955–1959).

From 1962 through 1964, he joined the faculty of Stanford. He then moved east to return to Harvard as a member of the faculty from 1964 to 1983. He was  director of the Edwin O. Reischauer Institute of Japanese Studies from 1981 through 1983, and also editor of the Harvard Journal of Asiatic Studies from 1975 to 1983.

In 1983, Shively returned to teach at Berkeley. He was also the head of the university's East Asian library until he retired in 1992. Dr. Shively died of Shy–Drager syndrome at the age of 84 in Oakland, California.

Selected works
Most notable among his works covering popular culture in the Edo period of Japan is the translation of The Love Suicides at Amijima, a famous kabuki play written by Chikamatsu Monzaemon.

In a statistical overview derived from writings by and about Donald Shively, OCLC/WorldCat encompasses roughly 40+ works in 90+ publications in 3 languages and 3,000+ library holdings.

 The Love Suicide at Amijima: a study of a Japanese Domestic Tragedy by Chikamatsu Monzaemon (1953)
 Personality in Japanese History (1970) with Albert Craig
 Tradition and Modernization in Japanese Culture (1971)
 The Cambridge History of Japan, Vol. 2, Heian Japan (1999)

Honors
 Order of the Rising Sun, 1982.

Notes

Further reading
 May, Meredith.  "Donald H. Shively -- scholar on Japan," San Francisco Chronicle. August 15, 2005.
H. Mack Horton In Memoriam, Donald Howard Shively, Professor of East Asian Languages, Emeritus, UC Berkeley, University of California (viewed April 10, 2009)

1921 births
2005 deaths
American Japanologists
University of California, Berkeley faculty
Stanford University faculty
Harvard University faculty
Deaths from multiple system atrophy
Neurological disease deaths in California
United States Marine Corps officers
United States Marine Corps personnel of World War II
Ritchie Boys
Harvard University alumni
The Journal of Asian Studies editors
American expatriates in Japan
Military personnel from California